Christopher Ahlberg, born 1968, is a Swedish/American computer scientist and executive. Ahlberg is the co-founder and CEO of Recorded Future, as well as Chair of the Board of Trustees of Hult International Business School.

Career
Before co-founding Recorded Future, Ahlberg was the president of the Spotfire Division of Tibco, which he founded as an independent company in 1996. In 2007, Spotfire was acquired by Tibco for US$195 million in cash. Spotfire was founded based on his research on information visualization at the University of Maryland under the guidance of Ben Shneiderman. Ahlberg founded his second company, Recorded Future, in 2009 and sold a majority stake in the company in 2019 for US$780 million to Insight Partners, and remains as the CEO. 

Ahlberg earned his doctorate from Chalmers University of Technology with a thesis titled Dynamic queries, and has worked as a visiting researcher at the University of Maryland. 

The US Patent Office has granted issuances to several of Ahlberg's applications for patents, primarily in software. He was named among the World's Top 100 Young Innovators by MIT Technology Review and received the TR100 award in 2002. Ahlberg is also a member of the Royal Swedish Academy of Engineering Sciences.

While  indicates an address and phone number in Moscow, Russia, that address and phone number are listed by more reliable sources as belonging to the Embassy of China, Moscow. His company, Recorded Future is headquartered near Davis Square, Massachusetts.

References

External links
 Recorded Future
 Spotfire Tibco

Hult International Business School administrators
Information visualization experts
Chalmers University of Technology alumni
Swedish computer scientists
Members of the Royal Swedish Academy of Engineering Sciences
1968 births
Living people